Harihara (Sanskrit: हरिहर) is the fused sattvika characterisation of Vishnu (Hari) and Shiva (Hara) from Hindu theology. Hari is the form of Vishnu, and Hara is the form of Shiva. Harihara is also known as Shankaranarayana ("Shankara" is Shiva, and "Narayana" is Vishnu).

Harihara is also sometimes used as a philosophical term to denote the unity of Vishnu and Shiva as different aspects of the same Ultimate Reality called Brahman. This concept of equivalence of various gods as one principle and "oneness of all existence" is discussed as Harihara in the texts of Advaita Vedanta school of Hindu philosophy.

Some of the earliest sculptures of Harihara, with one half of the image as Vishnu and other half as Shiva, are found in the surviving cave temples of India, such as in the cave 1 and cave 3 of the 6th-century Badami cave temples.

Concept

The diversity within Hinduism encourages a wide variety of beliefs and traditions, of which two important and large traditions are associated with Vishnu and Shiva. Some schools focus on Vishnu (including his associated avatars such as Rama and Krishna) as the Supreme God, and others on Shiva (including his different avatars such as Mahadeva and Pashupata). The Puranas and various Hindu traditions treat both Shiva and Vishnu as being different aspects of the one Brahman. Harihara is a symbolic representation of this idea. A similar idea, called Ardhanarishvara or Naranari, fuses masculine and feminine deities as one and equivalent representation in Hinduism.

Depending on which scriptures (and translations) are quoted, evidence is available to support each of the different arguments. In most cases, even if one personality is taken as being superior over the other, much respect is still offered to both Vishnu and Shiva by the other's worshippers (i.e. Shiva is still regarded as being above the level of an ordinary jiva and 'the greatest of the Vaishnavas' by Vaishnavas who worship only Vishnu).

Swaminarayan holds that Vishnu and Shiva are different aspects of the same God.

Legends 
The earliest mention of Harihara is likely to be observed in the Harivamsha, where Markandeya discusses the being. 

According to one legend, when Vishnu appeared as the enchantress Mohini in front of Shiva, the latter grew besotted with her and attempted to embrace her. At this moment, Mohini reverted to the true form of Vishnu, at which point the two deities fused as one being, Harihara.

Depictions

Harihara is depicted in art as split down the middle, one half representing Shiva, the other half representing Vishnu.  The Shiva half will have the matted locks of a yogic master piled high on his head and sometimes will wear a tiger skin, reserved for the most revered ascetics.  Shiva's pale skin may be read as ash-covered in his role as an ascetic.  The Vishnu half will wear a tall crown and other jewelry, representing his responsibility for maintaining world order. Vishnu's black skin represents holiness.  Broadly, these distinctions serve to represent the duality of humble religious influence in the ascetic and authoritative secular power in the king or householder.  However, in other aspects Shiva also takes on the authoritative position of householder, a position which is directly at odds with the ascetic position depicted in his Harihara manifestation.

Harihara has been part of temple iconography throughout South Asia and Southeast Asia, with some illustrations listed in the following table. In some states, the concept of Harihara appears through alternate names and its progeny; for example, temples incorporating Ayyappan and Shasta deities in Kerala illustrate this Hindu tradition there since at least the 7th century.

See also
 Ardhanarishvara
 Vaikuntha Kamalaja
 Ayyappan

References

External links

 Shiva and Vishnu as One and the Same (dlshq.org)
 Harihara - Photograph of Carving from Hoysaleshvara Temple, Halebid (art-and-archaeology.com)

Hindu philosophical concepts
Hindu gods
Forms of Shiva
Forms of Vishnu